Fouzia El Kassioui (born 1 January 1992) is a Moroccan Paralympic athlete.

Biography 
At the age of 10, she was diagnosed with Parkinson's disease and cerebral palsy. In 2017, she joined the Benslimane Al-Ahd Al-Jadid Association and began training in shot put.

At the 2019 World Para Athletics Championships held in Dubai, United Arab Emirates, she won the bronze medal in the women's shot put F33 event.

She won the silver medal in the women's shot put F33 event at the 2020 Summer Paralympics held in Tokyo, Japan. She also competed in the women's javelin throw F34 event.

References

External links 
 

Living people
1992 births
Moroccan female javelin throwers
Moroccan female shot putters
Paralympic athletes of Morocco
Athletes (track and field) at the 2020 Summer Paralympics
Medalists at the 2020 Summer Paralympics
Paralympic silver medalists for Morocco
Paralympic medalists in athletics (track and field)
Medalists at the World Para Athletics Championships
21st-century Moroccan women